Afro-Peruvian Classics: The Soul of Black Peru is a 1995 album. The album was compiled by David Byrne (of the band Talking Heads), and was one of the first international releases of Afro-Peruvian music.

Track listing
 "Maria Lando" (Landó) – Susana Baca
 "Yo No Soy Jaqui (I Am Not Jaqui)" (Landó) – Manuel Donayre
 "Canterurias (Songs)" (Landó) – Cecilia Barraza
 "Samba Malato" (Landó) – Lucila Campos
 "Enciendete Candela (Light the Flame)" (Ingá) – Conjunto Gente Morena & Roberto Rivas
 "Azucar de Caña (Sugarcane)" (Landó) – Eva Ayllon
 "Prendeme la Vela (Light My Candle)" (Alcatraz) – Abelardo Vasquez & Cumanana
 "Landó" – Chabuca Granda
 "Toro Mata (Bull Kills)" (Landó) – Lucila Campos
 "Son de los Diablos (Dance of the Devils)" – Peru Negro
 "No Me Cumben (That's Not for Me)" – Nicomedes Santa Cruz
 "Una Larga Noche" (A Long Night)" (Landó) – Chabuca Granda
 "Lando" (Landó) – Peru Negro
 "Maria Lando" (Landó) – David Byrne
 "Zapateo en Menor" (Instrumental) – Hidden Track

See also
 Música criolla

External links
Luaka Bop Page

Regional music compilation albums
1995 compilation albums
Luaka Bop compilation albums
Peruvian music
Latin music compilation albums